Obinna "Obi" Iyiegbu  (born 12 April 1975), commonly known as Obi Cubana, is a Nigerian entrepreneur and businessman who chairs the Cubana Group.

Early life 
Iyiegbu was born on 12 April 1975 in Anambra and his mother is Ezinne Iyiegbu. He is from Oba in Idemili South Local Government Area of Anambra State.

Education 
His early schooling was at Central Primary School before attending Dennis Memorial Grammar School for his secondary education. After his secondary education, he proceeded to the University of Nigeria Nsukka where he graduated with a Bachelor of Arts degree in Political Science in

Career 
Iyiegbu's career as an entrepreneur started in 2006 when he founded a night club called Ibiza Club in Abuja. In 2009, he established a hospitality club called Cubana in Owerri, Imo State.

References 

1975 births
Living people
Nigerian businesspeople
People from Anambra State